Church of the Three Crosses (also known as Vuoksenniska Church) is a Lutheran church located in Kaukopää, Imatra, Finland. The church was designed by Alvar Aalto and completed in 1958. It is said to be Aalto's most original church design. The church gets its name from the three crosses at the altar.

The church consists of three consecutive halls which can be separated by sliding walls; this enables parts of the church to be used for parish activities during the week. The exterior of the church is white with a copper roofing.

Docomomo has listed the church as a significant example of modern architecture in Finland. The Finnish Heritage Agency has also listed it as a nationally significant built heritage site. A committee designated by the Finnish Heritage Agency in 1998 to commemorate the centenary of Aalto's birth selected the church as one of the five most important buildings designed by Aalto.

Gallery

See also
 Lakeuden Risti Church, Seinäjoki
 Church of the Assumption of Mary, Riola di Vergato
 Church of the Holy Spirit, Wolfsburg

References

External links
 
 Kolmen Ristin kirkko 

Alvar Aalto buildings
Alvar Aalto churches
Churches completed in 1958
Modernist architecture in Finland
Lutheran churches in Finland
20th-century churches in Finland